Nakaab (2021) is  an Indian Hindi language crime, thriller, action web series written by Saurav Mohapatra and directed by Debarati Gupta, Soumik Sen and Ronty Sheikh. It stars Mallika Sherawat, Esha Gupta, Ankita Chakraborty, Chandra Shekhar Dutta, Rohini Chatterjee
and Rohit Basfore.

Plot 
The web series about mystery behind murder of an actress. Police officer Aditi Amre, appointed investigator, found shocking information on the actress.

Cast 
 Ankita Chakraborty as Cibha Dutta
 Esha Gupta as Aditi Amre
 Mallika Sherawat as Zohra Mehra
 Gautam Rode as Pawan Bisht
 Chandra Shekhar Dutta as Vinod Amre
 Rohini Chatterjee as News 365 Anchor
 Rohit Basfore as Shravan Kumar

Release 
Nakab trailer was released on 7 September 2021 and the web series was released on MX Player on 15 September 2021.

Reception 
Subhash K. Jha for SKJBollywoodnews rated 1/2 star and wrote "It wouldn’t be right to ask what is wrong with Nakaab. It would be better to ask,what is right with it.The answer is, nothing!  Every aspect of this tawdry trashy series deserves to be hooted and booted." 

Himesh Mankad for Pinkvilla wrote "The first episode is full of cliches – the powerful using their power to close the case, a junior level cop planning to run a parallel investigation going against the norm, a backstory to the TV star and of course, the dirty world of showbiz."

Scroll.in staff found resemblance to death of Sushant Singh Rajput and wrote "The series clearly intends to resonate with the death by suicide of Sushant Singh Rajput. Nakaab ventures to say something important about the seamy side of showbiz, but ends up being an exercise in cashing in on a tragedy." 

Shaheen Irani of OTTplay wrote "Zohra Mehra (Mallika Sherawat) gives a powerful performance. While being sensual, she also looks dangerous and scary." 

Shwetank Shekhar of TheLallantop wrote "Nakab has nothing new to offer to the audience, but one should watch the series if it's watchable."

References

External links
 

2020s Hindi-language films
2021 films
MX Player original programming